The 2013 season is Odd 5th consecutive year in Tippeligaen. It is Dag-Eilev Fagermo's sixth season as the club's manager. Odd also competed in the 2013 Norwegian Football Cup reaching the fourth round where they were knocked out by Bodø/Glimt.

Squad

On Loan

Transfers

Winter

In:

 

Out:

Summer

In:

Out:

Competitions

Tippeligaen

Results summary

Results by round

Results

Table

Norwegian Cup

Squad statistics

Appearances and goals

|-
|colspan="14"|Players away from Odd on loan:

|-
|colspan="14"|Players who appeared for Odd no longer at the club:

|}

Goal scorers

Disciplinary Record

Notes

References

Odds BK seasons
Odd